École secondaire les Etchemins (ESLE) is a French-language high school in Charny, Quebec, Canada operated by the Commission scolaire des Navigateurs school board. The principal is Sonia Bédard. The school includes the Salle Louis-Philippe Arcand auditorium.

In 2016, Yvan Girouard, a teacher at École secondaire les Etchemins, was the recipient of the Prime Minister's Awards for Teaching Excellence.

In 1994 and 1996, Chau Ly-Hai, a grade 11 chemistry teacher at École secondaire les Etchemins, was the recipient of the Prime Minister's Awards for Teaching Excellence.

References

External links

School page at school board's site

High schools in Quebec
Buildings and structures in Lévis, Quebec
Education in Chaudière-Appalaches